R. intermedia  may refer to:
 Radiacmea intermedia, a small sea snail species
 Raphidiophrys intermedia, a protist species in the genus Raphidiophrys
 Raphitoma intermedia, a sea snail species
 Rhabdomastix intermedia, a crane fly species in the genus Rhabdomastix
 Rosenscheldiella intermedia, a fungus species

See also
 Intermedia (disambiguation)